Rhacocnemis is a monotypic genus of Seychelloise huntsman spiders containing the single species, Rhacocnemis guttatus. It was first described by Eugène Louis Simon in 1897, and is endemic to the Seychelles.

See also
 List of Sparassidae species

References

Arthropods of Seychelles
Monotypic Araneomorphae genera
Sparassidae
Spiders of Africa